is a Japanese light novel series by Gakuto Mikumo, with illustrations by Nao Watanuki. The novel series began on July 10, 2005, with fourteen volumes currently published by ASCII Media Works under their Dengeki Bunko imprint. A manga adaptation by Ryō Akizuki premiered in ASCII Media Works' shōnen manga magazine Dengeki Daioh on September 27, 2008, and an anime adaptation began airing in Japan in April 2009.

Plot
The story is a semi-serious school action story revolving around Tomoharu Natsume. He is haunted by the ghost of his childhood friend, Misao Minakami, who died in an airplane accident three years earlier, which Tomoharu barely survived. On entering high school, Tomoharu takes the opportunity to live on his own and moves into Meiou-tei, a dormitory, where he starts enjoying a carefree high school life (also, his mother has recently remarried and doesn't want him interfering in her newlywed life). His life changes when a beautiful girl named Shuri Kurosaki appears with a mysterious trunk which she claims Tomoharu's brother, Naotaka Natsume, asked her to deliver to him. Things become complicated when Kanade Takatsuki, a girl dressed like a shrine maiden, appears seeking the trunk in Tomoharu's possession. It is revealed that the trunk hides secrets about the world they live in.

Characters

Science Club / Third Student Council President / Royal Dark Society
 , voiced by Miyu Irino, is the main protagonist of the series, often called "Tomo" by his closest friends. He controls Kurogane and became an Asura Cryin after he made a contract with Kanade Takatsuki which gave birth to Persephone.
 , voiced by Haruka Tomatsu, is Tomoharu's childhood friend, and the primary female heroine of the series. She appears with Tomoharu as a projection/ghost-like image, and is later discovered to be the "Burial Doll" of Tomoharu's Asura Machina: Kurogane. She loves Tomo more than anything and would do anything for him.
 , voiced by Ai Nonaka, is the second female heroine of the series. She is a demon which becomes a friend of Tomoharu Natsume. She seems to have feelings for Tomoharu. Later on in the series she and Tomoharu make a contract making Tomoharu an Asura Cryin and giving birth to Persephone, their child, owl.
 , voiced by Sayuri Yahagi, is a young, genius blonde-haired demon who recently transferred to Tomoharu's school and was placed into his care to protect her from a demon hunter. She is also known as a Luck Demon, due to her ability to give or take other people's luck.
 , voiced by Rie Tanaka, is Tomo, Misao, and Kanade's senpai. She was also involved in the plane crash, and nearly died.
 , voiced by Hiro Shimono, is a good friend of Tomoharu's. 
 , voiced by Shinji Kawada, is Aki and Toru's childhood friend and the main antagonist of season 2. 
 , voiced by Yuko Kaida, is the president of the Third Student Council, which was founded by members of the "Royal Dark Society".

First Student Council / Holy Guards
 , voiced by Shotaro Morikubo, is the head of the First Student Council on campus. 
 , voiced by Satomi Satō, is Reiko and Reishirou's cousin. Like Misao, she is a spirit/projection and the burial doll of Reishiro's Asura Machina. 
 , voiced by Kimiko Koyama, is Reishirou's younger sister and class president of Tomoharu's class.

Second Student Council / Pilgrim Union
 , voiced by Eri Kitamura, is the president of the Second Student Council, which supervises committees in the school. 
 , voiced by Junji Majima, is the treasurer of the Second Student Council, and also Rikka's manservant.

Kantou Student Union
 , voiced by Sayori Ishizuka, is Shirogane's former handler. You is called "GD's Destra". 
 , voiced by Hiromi Hirata, is Toru's sister and the former burial doll of Kurogane. 
 , voiced by Reiko Takagi, is the handler of Aenka and the members of GD. She uses the old style of the Japanese language.
 , voiced by Yoshinori Fujita, is the handler of Bismuth.

Tomoharu's relatives
 , voiced by Miyu Irino, is Tomoharu's older brother.
  is Tomoharu's stepsister. Although Tomoharu thinks she does not like him, which contributed to his decision to move into Meiou-tei and live on his own, she does in fact like him, but is too shy to speak easily to him.

Kanade's relatives
 , voiced by Eizou Tsuda, is Kanade's father, and the president of a large organization known as the Demon Association. 
 , voiced by Akihiko Ishizumi, is Kanade's grandfather and a lover of scrollwork. He is also the owner of the Meiou-tei.
 , voiced by Yōko Hikasa, is Kanade's cousin and a college student.

Others
 , voiced by Aki Toyosaki, is one of Tomoharu's few close friends, who calls Tomoharu by the nickname Tomo. 
 , voiced by Rie Tanaka, is Shuri's younger twin sister.
 , voiced by Ao Takahashi, is Tokiya's contracting demon, nicknamed "Kori Hime (Ice Princess)" from her looks and character. Hiwako uses an ice naginata named "Hyou-ou" when she fights. 
 , voiced by Kazuya Nakai, is the main antagonist of season 1. He is a famous guitarist, demon hunter, and lingerie thief, and is known as the "".

Media

Light novels

Manga

|}

Anime

The anime first premiered on April 2, 2009. The opening theme used for the first season is "Spiral" by Angela, and the ending theme is "Link", also by Angela. The single for the two songs was released on May 13, 2009. A second season aired on October 1, 2009, again using opening and ending themes by Angela. The opening theme of the second season is "Alternative", and the ending theme is "Kanata no delight". The series is licensed in North America by Maiden Japan.

Reception 
Theron Martin of the Anime News Network criticized the show for "generally failing to make sense".

References

External links
Asura Cryin' at ASCII Media Works 
Anime official website 

2005 Japanese novels
2008 manga
Anime and manga based on light novels
ASCII Media Works manga
AT-X (TV network) original programming
Dengeki Bunko
Dengeki Comics
Dengeki Daioh
Light novels
Maiden Japan
Novels set in high schools and secondary schools
Seven Arcs
Shōnen manga
Television shows based on light novels